Product Red, stylized as (PRODUCT) or (PRODUCT)RED, is a licensed brand by the company Red, stylized as (RED), that seeks to engage the private sector in raising awareness and funds to help eliminate HIV/AIDS in eight African countries, namely Eswatini (formerly Swaziland), Ghana, Kenya, Lesotho, Rwanda, South Africa, Tanzania, and Zambia. It is licensed to partner companies including Apple Inc., Nike, American Express (UK), The Coca-Cola Company, Starbucks, Converse, Electronic Arts, Primark, Head, Buckaroo, Penguin Classics (UK & International), Gap, Armani, FIAT, Hallmark (US), SAP, Beats Electronics, and Supercell. The concept was founded in 2006 by U2 frontman and activist Bono, together with Bobby Shriver of the One Campaign and DATA. The Global Fund to Fight AIDS, Tuberculosis and Malaria is the recipient of Product Red's money.

As part of a new business model, each partner company creates a product with the Product Red logo. In return for the opportunity to increase revenue through the Product Red license, up to 50% of profits gained by each partner is donated to the Global Fund. As Product Red is owned by Red, a portion of the contributions received from the partner brands is assigned as profit. Such an amalgamation of humanitarian aid and for-profit businesses is one example of "ethical consumerism".

In 2012, One Campaign acquired Red as a division of One. Both organizations were co-founded by Bono and Shriver.

Since 2020, Product Red has been used in the global fund to combat the COVID-19 pandemic.

The Global Fund
Created in 2006, the Global Fund to Fight AIDS, Tuberculosis and Malaria support large-scale prevention, treatment and care programs for these three infectious diseases. Today, 20 percent of all international funding for HIV/AIDS-related programs, 69 percent for tuberculosis, and 65 percent for malaria worldwide comes from the Global Fund. The concept of "performance-based funding" is central to the organization and only those grant recipients who can demonstrate measurable and effective results from the monies received will be able to receive continued financing. All of the funds generated by Red partners and events goes to Global Fund programs that provide medical care and support services for people affected by HIV/AIDS in Africa. No overhead is taken by either Red or the Global Fund. Red is the largest private sector donor to the Global Fund, and has generated over $600 million for HIV programs in Africa as of July 2019. In November 2013, Jony Ive and Marc Newson hosted an auction at Sotheby's to raise millions for the fund. The event was attended by major celebrities including Bono, The Edge, Hayden Panettiere, and Courtney Love.

Products

Products include:
 Bugaboo International. A design company that makes pushchairs for infants and toddlers. Bugaboo contributes 1% of its total revenue to The Global Fund.
 American Express Red card. Launched in 2006. 1% of spending is donated to the Global Fund.
 Gap sells a line of merchandise including T-shirts, jackets, scarves, gloves, jewelry, bags, and purses. Gap donates 50% of all Product Red profits directly to the Global Fund.
 Converse is selling a shoe made from African mud cloth.
 Giorgio Armani has announced a line of Emporio Armani products that include clothes, jewelry, perfume, and accessories. 40 percent of the gross profit goes to the Global Fund. 
 Motorola has announced special editions of their Slvr, Krzr and Razr mobile phones, with a 50% profit of each purchase going to the Global Fund.
 Canon released a version of their SD990 camera along with a leather case in 2008/2009. Only 500 were produced.
 The Independent newspaper is in partnership with Product Red. this partnership was launched in May 2006 by publishing a special issue of the newspaper and 50% of the revenue of this issue was donated to the Global Fund. 
 The Hotel Café tour is presented by MySpace and Product Red.
 Apple Inc. released a special edition iPod Touch 5th generation with a Product Red theme. Subsequently, they have released several Product Red devices and accessories. On 29 October 2013, Apple created and donated a one-of-a-kind Red Mac Pro computer which was auctioned by Sotheby's at the Red Auction on 23 November 2013 for $977,000 (Sotheby's had estimated it would bring $40,000-60,000). A one-of-a-kind pair of solid gold Apple EarPods were auctioned for $461,000. Apple sold a Product Red iPhone XR and claims to have donated almost $250 million to the Global Fund. The red iPhone 11, the red iPhone SE (2nd generation), the red iPhone 12, the red iPhone 13, the red iPhone SE (3rd generation), and the red iPhone 14 are also part of Product Red.
 Nike has released a special line of red shoelaces, with the profit going to the charity. Their motto is "Lace up, save lives."
 Hallmark has introduced greeting cards that are Product Red.
 In a partnership with Microsoft, Dell announced that it would manufacture versions of its computers (XPS One, XPS M1530, and XPS M1330) that would come with a Product Red version of Windows Vista Ultimate preinstalled. The company also released a Product Red printer.
 Microsoft would later release the Product Red version of Windows Vista Ultimate as a standalone product.
 Girl Skateboard Company released a two-part deck series with a Product Red graphic. A share of the profit goes to the charities.
 Starbucks participated during their 2008 holiday promotion. For every beverage bought on December 1 (World AIDS Day), 5 pennies went to Product Red. Starbucks also offers the Red Card, and donates five pennies every time the card is used.
 The Killers write a Christmas song every year, with the latest being "I'll Be Home For Christmas" and a compilation album of all their Christmas singles called "Don't Waste Your Wishes", in aid of Red. One hundred percent of profits are given to the charity.
 Monster Cable made special edition of Beats by Dr. Dre Solo HD with name Solo HD Product Red.
 Carolina Bucci has created a special edition of her gold and silk Lucky bracelets. 50 percent of the profit goes directly to the Global Fund.
 Tourneau created two special edition watches, with 15% of the retail price contributed to The Global Fund to Fight AIDS, Tuberculosis and Malaria.
 Belvedere vodka produces special edition Product Red bottles which is designed by South African Artist, Esther Mahlangu. A portion of the proceeds go to Product Red.
 Head produces special Red tennis bags as part of the Product Red project.
 In 2014, U2 released a charity single "Invisible", and a Super Bowl commercial to announce the partnership between Red and Bank of America.
 In 2014, some iOS apps and/or games, such as PewDiePie's Tuber Simulator, Angry Birds, Cut the Rope 2, The Sims FreePlay and Clash of Clans added a Red update for a limited time (November 24 - December 7), in which, the 100% of the money spent on the app or making an In-App Purchase will go to the Global Fund.
 In 2017, Amazon created a Red limited edition of the Echo speaker to support the Global Fund. In November 2020 a newer version of Echo Product Red was revealed.

Criticism

Product Red has been criticized for not having an effect proportional to the advertising investment, for being much less efficient than direct charitable contribution, and for having a lack of transparency with regards to the amount of money going to charity as a percentage of every purchase. Some critics argue that a retail middleman between donor and charity is unnecessary; donors should just give.

For example, some argued that Gap's website encouraged consumption of the products, thus, encouraging companies to use the product for publicity, rather than social responsibility. While Product Red has helped give funds and attention to the problem, it does not form a relationship between the donors and recipients. Scholars argue that this sacrifices the purpose of movements such as Product Red. Jessica Wirgau, a professor at the Virginia Polytechnic Institute stated that, "Red not only misses the opportunity to promote civic engagement with its audience but also ... gives corporations the power to decide which causes should be supported and to what degree". 

Another critique is that Product Red's expansion into traditional fundraising techniques, such as art auctions, undermines its claim to be a different and more sustainable approach to raising money for AIDS. Other critics have pointed out that its emphasis on funding treatment for AIDS sufferers meant that large amounts of the money will ultimately end up with pharmaceutical companies "unwilling to distribute their drugs for free". Many accuse the campaign of profiting by using diseases as a marketing vehicle, for being "cause branding" rather than corporate social responsibility. In the Stanford Social Innovation Review, Mark Rosenman wrote that it was an "example of the corporate world aligning its operations with its central purpose of increasing shareholder profit, except this time it is being cloaked in the patina of philanthropy."

The National Labor Committee for Worker and Human Rights criticized Product Red for its links with Gap, which was historically a target of anti-sweatshop activists, although anti-sweatshop organization Labour Behind the Label states that Gap has "come further than many" clothing companies to counter exploitation. Gap's Product Red clothes are made in Lesotho rather than China, going beyond the requirements of Product Red. Labour Behind the Label criticized Product Red for not requiring more measures to protect the rights of the workers who make their products.

Data released in 2007 by Advertising Age claimed retail participants in Product Red including Gap, Motorola and Apple had invested $100 million in advertising and raised only $18 million for The Global Fund. In July 2010, however, Red claimed to have raised over $150 million.

In an attempt to combat the critics, particularly regarding Product Red's Transparency, around 2008, they implemented a calculator to show consumers how many doses of treatment would be received with the purchase of a Red Product. With this, some have stated that, "the campaign offers the illusion of activism without requiring behavioral changes or political engagement". While this critic shows that there are negative aspects of this program, he also states that "it finds a way to generate something positive out of the currently existent system".

Timeline

See also 

 The Lazarus Effect
 Cause marketing
 The Global Fund to Fight AIDS, Tuberculosis and Malaria

Notes

References

 Tim Weber (2006). "Bono bets on Red to battle Aids". BBC. Retrieved February 26, 2006.
 Motorola Press Release Retrieved May 15, 2006.

External links
 

Organizations established in 2006
2012 mergers and acquisitions
HIV/AIDS activism
Organizations founded by Bono